Miles Harvey is an American journalist and author. He is best known for his 2000 book, The Island of Lost Maps, which recounted the story of a Floridian named Gilbert Bland, who stole old and precious maps from libraries across America.

Harvey graduated from the University of Illinois at Urbana-Champaign in 1984 with a B.S. degree in journalism and earned an M.F.A. degree in English from the University of Michigan in 1991. He worked for United Press International, In These Times and Outside. While at Outside he wrote a 1997 story on Gilbert Bland, which was the origin for The Island of Lost Maps.

Harvey states that he has had a lifelong fascination with maps, which he partially attributes to his father's similar interest. The Island of Lost Maps doesn't just tell the story of Bland's crimes, but also relates much cartographic lore and legend and includes material on Harvey's own life and family. He lives in Chicago and received a 2004 fellowship for fiction from the Illinois Arts Council.

In 2008, Harvey published his second book, Painter in a Savage Land: The Strange Saga of the First European Artist in North America.  This is a non-fiction work that chronicles Jacques Le Moyne de Morgues's adventures with the French expedition to Florida led by Jean Ribault during the sixteenth century.

References

External links
Miles Harvey website
List of Miles Harvey stories for Outside, including his original story on Gilbert Bland
The Drought, short story by Miles Harvey
Why I Married My Wife, short story by Miles Harvey
Bella Stander interview with Miles Harvey

Year of birth missing (living people)
Living people
American male journalists
American short story writers
American non-fiction crime writers
Writers from Chicago
University of Illinois alumni
University of Michigan alumni
American male short story writers